Nesheim is a village in Vaksdal municipality in Vestland county, Norway.  The village is located in the upper part of the Eksingedalen valley, along the river Storelvi.  The village sits at the intersection of two roads: County Road 344 which runs through the whole valley and County Road 313 which crosses the mountains into the next valley to the south, Teigdalen (in Voss).  Nesheim is the site of Nesheim Church.

References

Villages in Vestland
Vaksdal